Three Rock Mountain (archaic: Sliabh Ruadh) is a mountain in Co Dublin, Ireland. The mountain takes its name from the three groups of granite rocks at the summit. It was once believed that these features were man-made: for instance, Gabriel Beranger wrote of them in 1780, "I take them to be altars upon which sacrifices were offered […] the regularity which is observed in piling them convinces me they are the work of man, as they could not grow in that position". In fact, the three outcrops are tors: natural geological features produced by the gradual process of weathering. Today, the summit is dominated by the many radio masts and towers that use the site to broadcast their signals across the Dublin area below. The forestry plantations on the slopes consist mainly of Sitka spruce, Japanese larch, Scots pine, Monterey pine and lodgepole pine.

Access and recreation
The views from the summit are extensive and have attracted visitors for many years. The writer Weston St. John Joyce described the vista thus: "The view from this commanding height, 1,479 feet over sea-level, extends over a vast tract of mountain, sea, and plain, comprising, to the north, the blue waters of Dublin Bay, with Clontarf and Howth, the Naul or Man-of-War hills, and the Mourne Mountains; eastward, Kingstown, Dalkey, and Killiney, and then in succession the fertile vale of Shanganagh, Carrickgollogan, the Scalp, Bray Head, the Sugar Loaves, and the slopes of Prince William's Seat. In clear weather Holyhead and the Welsh mountains may frequently be discerned, Snowdon and the Llanberis Pass being usually the most conspicuous, but occasionally the elongated outline of Cader Idris may be observed some distance to the right". By way of contrast, Gabriel Beranger said of Three Rock, "The extensive summit of this mountain, the parched ground and its solitude, make it the most awful spot I had ever seen".

Access to the mountain is possible via the Coillte-owned forest recreation areas of Ticknock and Kilmashogue. The route via Kilmashogue follows the Wicklow Way hiking trail for part of the way. Three Rock is also traversed by the Dublin Mountains Way hiking trail that runs between Shankill and Tallaght. In 2007 a concept was submitted to DLR Co Co to create a Cableway from Sandyford Luas to Three Rock and to open up the views to touristic and easier access.

Several local sports clubs take their name from the mountain such as the Three Rock Orienteering Club has mapped the area and run orienteering competitions there since 1981 as well as Three Rock Rovers Hockey Club (field hockey) and Three Rock Rovers association football club.

History
On the top of the central tor at the summit are four bowl-shaped depressions: these are bullauns which were used in early Christian times for grinding. At one time, to the east of central tor was the remains of an abandoned public house.

Close to the summit is the ruins of an old army shooting range which closed in the 1970s. The targets were raised and lowered by 12 men using levers in a concrete dugout. A red flag was raised along the forest road to alert visitors that firing exercises were in progress.

The remains of several hill forts, ring forts and other enclosures are to be found on the slopes of the mountain though they have largely disappeared under the forestry plantations.

During the nineteenth century, much of the lower slopes of Three Rock were covered with small quarries, especially around the village of Barnacullia, which supplied paving stones for Dublin Corporation for many years. Close to Barnacullia was a cottage that was occupied for many years by the Countess Markievicz up until the 1916 Easter Rising. The children of James Connolly stayed at the cottage during the week of the Rising. During the Irish War of Independence (1919–21) the 6th Battalion of the Dublin Brigade established a camp at Barnacullia.

Further down the slopes, near the Ticknock Road, is a holy well, known as Grumley's Well, reputed to cure eye ailments.

Transmission site
The main transmission site on Three Rock is owned and operated by 2RN a subsidiary of the Irish national broadcaster RTÉ, its 140-metre (360') cable-stayed mast is close to the peak, which is 448 metres (1470') above Ordnance Datum.

This site, and Cairn Hill in County Longford, were the first UHF television transmitters built by RTÉ to facilitate the introduction of their second television channel (RTÉ 2) in 1978. Both transmitters also helped improve television reception in their respective service areas. Since 1961 Dublin city had been served by the Kippure VHF television transmitter in County Wicklow which did not cover some Eastern and Southern parts of the city very satisfactorily. A low-power VHF TV relay transmitter (now defunct) had broadcast from the links tower at the RTÉ campus in Donnybrook to serve most of the districts not reached by Kippure. The original transmission tower on the site was superseded by the present 140m mast in 2002, but the tower remains as a microwave link facility carrying service feeds for broadcast and telecoms.

Today the Three Rock transmitters provide the Irish digital television service, Saorview, to Dublin city and county, as well as FM and DAB radio networks. Other masts at the site carry the majority of Dublin's local radio stations.

Current transmissions

Digital television

Digital radio

Analogue FM radio

Three Rock Digital TV relay transmitters

References

Bibliography

External links
Three Rock Mountain at Dublin Mountains Partnership
Three Rock Mountain at Megalithomania
 at 

Mass media in the Republic of Ireland
Transmitter sites in Ireland
Mountains and hills of Dún Laoghaire–Rathdown